Celticism may refer to:
a word or linguistic property adapted from a Celtic language (c.f. Anglicism, Germanism)
List of English words of Celtic origin
List of English words of Scottish Gaelic origin
Irish words used in the English language
List of English words of Irish origin
List of English words of Welsh origin
Hiberno-English
Kiltartanese
political Pan-Celticism
the ideology of Lega Nord which culturally identifies with the Celtic people
the Romanticist Celtic revival (c.f. Orientalism)
Celts (modern), a modern Celtic identity that has emerged in Western Europe since the 18th century
Celtism also known as Celtic Neopaganism
Celticisation, the historic process of conquering and assimilating by the ancient Celts
The name of a CD released in 2011 by Robert Marr